Sandra Klemenschits (born 13 November 1982) is an Austrian former professional tennis player. She won one doubles title on the WTA Tour (with Andreja Klepač) and 40 doubles titles on the ITF Circuit.

Klemenschits announced that the 2016 Generali Ladies Linz would be her last tournament before her retirement from professional tennis.

Career

2013
Klemenschits has had the best season of her career in 2013. She made a main-draw appearance in a major doubles event for the first time in over two years. Partnering with Romina Oprandi, she made it to the second round of Wimbledon, her farthest appearance in a Grand Slam tournament. After Wimbledon, Klemenschits had great success on the European clay with her regular partner of that year, Andreja Klepač. The team made the semifinals in Budapest and the week after won its first WTA title at Klemenschits' home tournament, Gastein Ladies, in Bad Gastein, Austria.

Personal life
In January 2007 Klemenschits and her twin sister Daniela with whom she was regularly playing doubles were diagnosed with a rare form of abdominal cancer, squamous cell carcinoma, forcing them to retire. Her sister died of the cancer on 9 April 2008. Sandra returned to the doubles tour in July 2008, and has since won more ITF doubles titles as well as her first WTA doubles title in July 2013.

WTA career finals

Doubles: 3 (1 title, 2 runner-ups)

ITF finals

Singles: 8 (5–3)

Doubles: 83 (40–43)

Grand Slam doubles performance timeline

References

External links

 
 
 

1982 births
Living people
Austrian female tennis players
Tennis players from Vienna
Austrian twins
Twin sportspeople
20th-century Austrian women
21st-century Austrian women